Jacques Gay (born in Voreppe, Isère on 22 February 1851, and died in Grenoble on 6 May 1925) was a French painter.

Biography
Jacques Gay was a pupil of Firmin Gauthier and Jean-Léon Gérôme in Paris. He is a painter of genre works, a portraitist and a landscaping, and painted many rural scenes. Friend of Ernest Hebert, he was part of the painters group in Proveysieux, with Jean Achard and Théodore Ravanat. He also attended the École dauphinoise.

He worked regularly at the Salon from 1878 to 1902. He painted Dauphiné villages, inhabitants, and interiors with a realistic style and with a warm sensitivity.

His paintings can be seen at the Museum of Grenoble.

References
 Nathalie Servonnat-Favier, catalog of the exhibition Peintre(s) à Proveysieux, Musée de l'Ancien Évêché, Grenoble, 2003,
 Dictionnaire des petits Maitres de la Peinture (1820-1920), Pierre Cabanne and Gerald Schurr, Amateur editions, 2003

External links
 Works by Jacques Gay, on Culture.gouv.fr

1851 births
1925 deaths
People from Voreppe
19th-century French painters
French male painters
20th-century French painters
20th-century French male artists
19th-century French male artists